Hawkwell is a village and civil parish in the district of Rochford in Essex, England. It is the second largest village after Rayleigh. The 2001 census gave a population for the parish of 11,231, increasing to 11,730 at the 2011 Census.

Hawkwell is mentioned in the Domesday Book of 1086, but not as 'Hawkwell', it appears as Hacuuella or Hechuuella.

Settlement
The parish includes the village itself, and also much larger suburban developments in the east (running into Rochford) and the west (running into Hockley).  East and West Hawkwell are divided by the London to Southend railway line. The White Hart Public House is no longer within Hawkwell since boundary changes and the only public house within Hawkwell is The Victory Inn.

Church

The parish church of St Mary the Virgin is located amidst fields between the two centres of population. The building is Grade II* listed building, and is largely from the fourteenth century, with the addition of a fifteenth-century bell turret and some other alterations. It was restored in the nineteenth century, and includes twentieth-century stained glass in the south and east windows. The building was damaged during a bombing raid on 15 September 1940. The concrete and asbestos vestry on the north side was removed in the 1990s, and was replaced by a north aisle, vestry and office constructed in a style to match the rest of the building. The extension nearly doubled the size of the building, and was opened in July 1996.

Amenities

The village has a primary school, leisure centre, pub and other amenities.

References

External links

Hawkwell Residents Association
 A Blog from a Hawkwell District Councillor
Hockley & Hawkwell Methodist Church
Hawkwell Parish Church, St. Mary's and Emmanuel

Villages in Essex
Rochford District
Civil parishes in Essex